Headkick Facsimile is an EP by American noise rock band Cop Shoot Cop, released in 1989 by Supernatural Organization.

Track listing

Personnel
Adapted from the Headkick Facsimile liner notes.

Cop Shoot Cop
Tod Ashley – lead vocals, bass guitar
David Ouimet – sampler
Phil Puleo – drums, percussion

Production and additional personnel
Cop Shoot Cop – production, mixing
Subvert Entertainment – cover art, design
Wharton Tiers – engineering, mixing

Release history

References

External links 
 

1989 debut EPs
Cop Shoot Cop albums